The 1972–73 Kansas Jayhawks men's basketball team represented the University of Kansas during the 1972–73 NCAA Division I men's basketball season.

Roster
Rick Suttle
Tom Kivisto
Dale Greenlee
Danny Knight
Tommie Smith
Marshall Rogers
Wilson Barrow
Dave Taynor
Mike Fiddelke
Dale Haase
Nino Samuel
Derrick Glanton
D. Rogers

Schedule

References

Kansas Jayhawks men's basketball seasons
Kansas
Kansas Jay
Kansas Jay